German submarine U-858 was a Type IXC/40 U-boat of Nazi Germany's Kriegsmarine during World War II. She was ordered on 5 June 1941, laid down on 11 December 1942 and launched on 17 June 1943. She had one commander for her two patrols, Kapitänleutnant Thilo Bode.

Design
German Type IXC/40 submarines were slightly larger than the original Type IXCs. U-858 had a displacement of  when at the surface and  while submerged. She had two shafts and two  propellers.

U-858 was fitted with six  torpedo tubes (four fitted at the bow and two at the stern), 22 torpedoes, one  SK C/32 naval gun, 180 rounds, and a  Flak M42 as well as two twin  C/30 anti-aircraft guns. The boat had a complement of forty-eight.

Service history

She was sent by Germany at the end of the war to cause havoc along the East Coast of the US, in an attempt to repeat the success of Operation Drumbeat. However, she saw no combat in that mission and did not sink or damage any allied ships during the war. Her captain surrendered her on 14 May 1945 at Fort Miles, Lewes, Delaware. U-858 was the first enemy ship to surrender to the United States forces following the defeat of Germany in World War II. After surrendering, she was used for publicity in War bond drives.

After being used for torpedo practice near the New England area, she was scuttled by the US Navy on 21 November 1947.

References

Bibliography

External links

 https://web.archive.org/web/20100508063721/http://www.fortmilesha.org/newsletter/pdf/nl_win_04.pdf p4

German Type IX submarines
U-boats commissioned in 1943
1943 ships
World War II submarines of Germany
Ships built in Bremen (state)
U-boats sunk in 1947
Maritime incidents in 1947
Shipwrecks in the Atlantic Ocean